Old Settlers Cemetery may refer to:
 Old Settlers Cemetery (also known as Thrasher Cemetery), in the grounds of Southern Maine Community College, South Portland, Maine, United States
 Old Settlers' Cemetery (Charlotte, North Carolina), United States